Getting On is an American medical comedy series created by Mark V. Olsen and Will Scheffer, based on the British series of the same name. The series premiered on HBO on November 24, 2013, and stars Laurie Metcalf, Alex Borstein, Niecy Nash, and Mel Rodriguez in the four regular roles.

Series overview

Episodes

Season 1 (2013)

Season 2 (2014)

Season 3 (2015)

References

External links

Lists of American comedy television series episodes